
Gmina Głogówek, German Gemeinde Oberglogau is an urban-rural gmina (administrative district) in Prudnik County, Opole Voivodeship, in south-western Poland, on the Czech border in Upper Silesia.

Since 2009, the township, like much of the area, has been officially bilingual in German and Polish.

Villages
Apart from the town of Głogówek, the gmina contains villages and settlements of:

Anachów
Biedrzychowice
Błażejowice Dolne
But
Ciesznów
Dzierżysławice
Golczowice
Góreczno
Kazimierz
Kierpień
Leśnik
Małkowice
Mionów
Mochów
Mucków
Nowe Kotkowice
Nowe Kotkowice-Chudoba
Racławice Śląskie
Rzepcze
Stare Kotkowice
Sysłów
Szonów
Tomice
Twardawa
Wierzch
Wróblin
Zawada
Zwiastowice

Demographics
As of 31 December 2010, the commune had 14,013 inhabitants. At the time of the census of 2002, the commune had 15,106 inhabitants. Of these, 10,451 (69.1%) declared the Polish nationality; 3,757 persons (24.8%) declared the German nationality; and 219 (1.4%) with the non-recognized Silesian nationality. 679 inhabitants (4.4%) declared no nationality.

Neighbouring gminas
Gmina Głogówek is bordered by the communes of Biała, Głubczyce, Krapkowice, Lubrza, Pawłowiczki, Reńska Wieś, Strzeleczki and Walce. It also borders the Czech Republic.

Twin towns – sister cities

Gmina Głogówek is twinned with:
 Rietberg, Germany
 Vrbno pod Pradědem, Czech Republic

References

Glogowek
Prudnik County
Bilingual communes in Poland